Jesse Greenway, known by the stage name Jeshi, is a musical artist based in London. His music predominantly covers working class disenfranchisement under austerity in Britain through personal storytelling and powerful social commentary.

Personal life 
Jeshi was born to a working-class family in Walthamstow, East London. He was raised predominantly by his mother and grandmother, describing his father as "absent", something shared by many of those around him. Despite not having a particularly musical upbringing, he recounted spending "hours glued to the TV watching MTV" and  Channel U (UK). He has depicted his influences as broad, ranging from The Streets and Dizzee Rascal to Toro y Moi as well as Trip Hop bands such as Massive Attack and Portishead. In a discussion with Don Letts for The Face, Jeshi described experiencing Stop and Search growing up. He has also stated that he was physically assaulted in front of his family at the age of 15; he describes undergoing this experience, and choosing not to retaliate afterward, as a pivotal moment in his life.

Career 
Jeshi began making grime tracks with friends in the late 2000s, utilising the free music technology available to him at the time at school. He released his debut EP Pussy Palace in 2016. Much of his early work was "super DIY... Recorded at home, in friend's bedrooms, kitchens... anywhere". He followed up on this with a second EP titled The Worlds Spinning Too Fast which featured production from Mura Masa. He then took a hiatus from releasing any solo material however appeared on a feature track titled I Don't Owe U NYthing with Vegyn and Summer with Brit Awards Rising Star winner Celeste.

In 2020, Jeshi released his EP Bad Taste, which featured collaborations with Fredwave, John Glacier and a second collaboration with Celeste titled 30,000 FEET. The EP's lead single Coming Down features a sample from    British electronic group Jungle (band).  Jeshi's second collaboration with Vegyn "I See You Sometimes" was featured in Chanel's 2021 Cruise Show.

Jeshi released his debut studio album, Universal Credit, in May 2022. The album is titled in reference to the universal credit policy, an Conservative Party-led overhaul of the British benefits system. The universal credit policy has been criticised for exacerbating inequality. The album was described by reviewers as political, with subject matter ranging from partying to suicide and council housing maintenance. Jeshi has described his choice of title as a way to "give power to words that often carry a negative weight for a lot of people". The album's cover art depicts Jeshi receiving an oversized cheque for £324.84, a direct reference to the amount of money given to him monthly while being on Universal Credit and writing the album at the time.

The music video for his track "3210" won the award for Best Independent Video at the AIM Independent Music Awards in 2022 and received a nomination for UK Music Video Awards.

Discography

Studio albums 
 Universal Credit (2022)

EPs 
 Pussy Palace (2016)
 The Worlds Spinning Too Fast (2017)
 Bad Taste (2020)

References 

Black British male rappers
English male rappers
Rappers from London
21st-century British rappers
21st-century British male musicians
People from Walthamstow
1995 births
Living people